The 2010 Australian Rally Championship is series of six rallying events held across Australia, including the international event 2010 International Rally of Queensland. It is the 43rd season in the history of the competition.

Husband and wife team Simon and Sue Evans won their fourth Australian Rally Championship in five years. Driving their own privately prepared Subaru Impreza the duo became the first pair to win the Championship in vehicles of three different manufacturers.

Season review
After winning the 2009 championship in a Mitsubishi the Evans returned in 2010 with a Subaru, while after a several year lay-off the Pedder brothers in a two car team of Mitsubishis. Scott Pedder was instantly competitive, winning the opening round of the series, the all-tarmac Rally Tasmania. Simon Evans and his brother Eli, driving a JAS Motorsport built Honda Civic Type-R, shared the second places. With the dirt-surface season commencing with the Forest Rally, Peddar won both heats again from Evans. Former factory Ford rallyist Darren Windus making a one-off appearance at his home event in a Toyota and Ryan Smart, also Toyota mounted shared the third places. Next the Australian Championship returned to Coffs Harbour when Simon Evans won his first Heat for the year and backed it up immediately. Pedder was second in Heat 1 but rolled out of the rally in Heat 2. Mitsubishi driver Nathan Quinn finished second in Heat 2, with Smart taking a pair of thirds.

At Rally SA Evans won Heat 1 from Pedder and Mitsubishi driver Justin Dowel, but Heat 2 saw Evans win unopposed as an accident took Pedder out of the rally and the championship. While co-driver John Mortimer was largely unhurt, Pedder sustained a knee and ankle injuries ruling him out of a return to the championship in 2010. Evans won the heat from Quinn and Eli Evans.

Evans won the International Rally of Queensland, the ARCs annual get-together with the Asia-Pacific Rally Championship. Glen Raymond was second in a Mitsubishi with Mark Pedder third. The victory was enough for Evans to secure his fourth championship. Reymond struck back at his home event when Evans and Pedder stuck trouble and the Mitsubishi driver raced home to take a popular win Rally Victoria. Fellow Mitsubishi drivers Justin Dowel and Mark Pedder finished second and third. The podium finish for Pedder allowed him to tie on points with Ryan Smart for runner's up in the championship. The countback worked in Smart's favour giving him and sister Rebecca Smart second place in the title.

Scott Pedder still had enough points to finish fourth in the title, four points ahead of Queensland Mitsubishi driver Steven Shepheard. Glen Raymond and Eli Evans all finished the season within ten points of Scott Peddar.

Mitsubishi won the manufacturers title, 444 points to Subaru's 432. Eli Evans in the Honda took out the two-wheel drive title convincingly. Mitsubishi driver Michael Boaden won the Privateer's Cup.

The Rallies

The 2010 season featured six rallies.

Teams & Drivers

The following are the competitors from the 2010 ARC season.

Drivers Championship
Pointscore as follows.

References

Rally Championship
Rally competitions in Australia
2010 in rallying